Olha Oleksandrivna Leleiko (born 21 July 1977) is a Ukrainian fencer. She competed in the women's foil events at the 2000, 2008, 2012, and 2016 Summer Olympics.

References

External links
 

1977 births
Living people
Ukrainian female foil fencers
Olympic fencers of Ukraine
Fencers at the 2000 Summer Olympics
Fencers at the 2008 Summer Olympics
Fencers at the 2012 Summer Olympics
Fencers at the 2016 Summer Olympics
Sportspeople from Kyiv
European Games competitors for Ukraine
Fencers at the 2015 European Games
20th-century Ukrainian women
21st-century Ukrainian women